Guitar Town is the debut studio album from American singer-songwriter Steve Earle, released on March 5, 1986. It topped the Billboard country album charts, and the title song reached #7 on the country singles charts. Earle was also nominated for two 1987 Grammy Awards, Best Male Country Vocalist and Best Country Song, for the title track.

Production
The album was recorded in late 1985 and early 1986 in Nashville, Tennessee, at Sound Stage Studio. Overdubs were later recorded at Nashville's Emerald Studios. It was one of the first country music albums to be recorded digitally, utilizing the Mitsubishi X-800. Each of the album's ten tracks was either written or co-written by Earle.

Reception and legacy
In 2003, the album was ranked number 489 on Rolling Stone magazine's list of the 500 greatest albums of all time. In 2012, the magazine ranked it at #482 on a revised list, calling it "the rocker's version of country, packed with songs about hard living in the Reagan Eighties."

In 2006, it ranked 27th on CMT's "40 Greatest Albums in Country Music". In 2016, the album was re-released as a 30th Anniversary Edition with a corresponding tour.

The title track was later covered by Emmylou Harris.  "Someday" was later covered by Shawn Colvin on her cover album, Cover Girl.

Track listing
All songs written by Steve Earle unless otherwise noted

 "Guitar Town" – 2:33
 "Goodbye's All We've Got Left" – 3:16
 "Hillbilly Highway" (Earle, Jimbeau Hinson) – 3:38
 "Good Ol' Boy (Gettin' Tough)" (Earle, Richard Bennett) – 3:58
 "My Old Friend the Blues" – 3:07
 "Someday" – 3:46
 "Think It Over" (Bennett, Earle) – 2:13
 "Fearless Heart" – 4:04
 "Little Rock 'n' Roller" – 4:49
 "Down the Road" (Tony Brown, Earle, Hinson) – 2:37

Bonus track on 2002 Remastered CD
 "State Trooper" [live] (Bruce Springsteen) – 5:12

Personnel
 Steve Earle – guitar, vocals
The Dukes
 Bucky Baxter – pedal steel guitar, guitar on "State Trooper"
 Richard Bennett – guitar, 6-string bass, slap bass, associate producer
 Ken Moore – organ, synthesizer, keyboards on "State Trooper"
 Emory Gordy, Jr. – bass, mandolin, producer
 Harry Stinson – drums, vocals
Reno Kling - bass on "State Trooper"
Michael McAdam - guitar on "State Trooper"
Additional musicians
 Paul Franklin – pedal steel guitar on "Fearless Heart" and "Someday"
 John Barlow Jarvis – synthesizer, piano
 Steve Nathan – synthesizer
Technical
Chuck Ainlay - recording, mixing
Alan Messer - photography

Charts

Weekly charts

Year-end charts

Singles

Certifications

References

External links

Guitar Town (Adobe Flash) at Radio3Net (streamed copy where licensed)

1986 debut albums
Steve Earle albums
Albums produced by Emory Gordy Jr.
Albums produced by Tony Brown (record producer)
Albums produced by Richard Bennett (guitarist)
MCA Records albums